LGBT rights differ between the various states in the Caribbean. They are influenced by previous colonization from Europe as well as each state's own interpretation of laws. For many of the states, perceptions of LGBT individuals are unfavorable, and laws lack protections and rights for the community.

History 
The Caribbean has been heavily colonized throughout history by European countries, with Spain, England, France and the Netherlands as the main colonizers, and the United States later on.  With them came religion, particularly forms of Christianity such as Catholicism and Protestantism that would become integrated with many of the countries.  This also came with it religious views that would encourage discrimination against LGBT members as well as direct legislation from the European countries. Most notable is Britain's Offences Against the Person Act 1861, which outlined many crimes and named sodomy as one of them.  While some of these laws would be repealed over time, some Caribbean countries maintain their own legislation that continues to outlaw sexual acts among LGBT. A notable example is Jamaica, that has laws prohibiting anal sex as well as intimacy between same-sex individuals.

Laws

See also 
 LGBT rights in the Americas

References 

Wikipedia Student Program